Northwest State Community College is a public community college near Archbold, Ohio. It is accredited by the Higher Learning Commission.  Its current president is Todd Hernandez.

The college is divided into five academic divisions with nearly 70 degree and certificate programs available. The five academic divisions are the Allied Health Business & Public Service Division, the Arts & Science Division, the Industrial Technologies Division, the Nursing Division, and the STEM Division.

History 
In 1968, the Ohio Board of Regents approved the creation of NSCC, then titled "Four County Technical Institute". In 1972, the institute was renamed Northwest Technical College. In 1994, the institute officially became a community college, changing its name one last time to Northwest State Community College.

Campus 
The main NSCC Campus in Archbold, OH is a two-story building that is a combination of several different buildings.

NSCC is also in the process of developing a full-service campus in Van Wert, OH for Paulding and Van Wert County learners. On-site learning is expected to begin in 2023.

Honor societies 
 Alpha Delta Nu - Nursing honor society.
 Kappa Beta Delta - Business honor society.
 Phi Theta Kappa

Admissions and students 
Headcount rates vary due to various economic variables from year to year. However, NSCC is an open enrollment college.

References

External links
Official website

Community colleges in Ohio
Education in Henry County, Ohio
Buildings and structures in Henry County, Ohio